This page details statistics of the African Cup of Champions Clubs and CAF Champions League.

General performances

By club

By nation

By semi-final appearances

years from 1997 to 2000 the two winners of the two groups were qualifying to the final directly with no semi final stage.

Records and statistics of Champions League era

Participation and group stage qualification
The following table shows teams that took part in the Champions League since its inception in 1997 (up to 2019-20 season), number and years of their appearances and group stage qualification. Number in bracket next to country name denotes number of teams that represented that country in the competition, while countries in red did not have group stage representative.

Total of 406 clubs participated in the Champions League era (teams included are those that found themselves in the draw, regarding of whether they played or not in that specific season), 183 teams participated only once (25 editions, including 2020-21 edition). 80 teams from 27 countries qualified to group stage (including 2020-21 season) while 28 countries did not have group stage representative.

After 2018 edition CAF moved its club competitions to autumn-spring format, meaning that editions after 2018 were played through two years (e.g. 2018–19, 2019–20). In the table below 2019 stands for 2018–19 season, 2020 for 2019–20 season and so on.

Teams are sorted by number of appearances. If the number is same for two or more teams, team that appeared before in their first appearance are listed first.

W denotes team that was part of the draw, but withdrew (or was ejected by the Confederation) before playing any game.
WG denotes team that qualified to group stage but was disqualified with all of its results annulled.

Records
Last updated on April 23, 2022
Most titles: 10
Al-Ahly  in 1982, 1987, 2001, 2005, 2006, 2008, 2012, 2013, 2020, 2021

Most appearances: 24
Al-Ahly  (1998 to 2002 and 2004 to 2021-22)

Most consecutive appearances: 19
Al-Ahly  (2004 to 2021-22)
Al-Hilal  (2004 to 2021-22)

Most consecutive matches without losing: 20
Espérance  recorded best undefeated streak through three seasons: 2018 (1 match), 2019 (12 matches), 2020 (7 matches)

Undefeated through entire season:
Espérance  in 1994 in 10 matches (7-3-0) and in 2018-19 in 12 matches (8-4-0)
Al-Ahly  in 2005 in 14 matches (9-5-0 record)

Most goals scored in a season: 36
Al-Ahly  in 2020, 19 goals in preliminary rounds, 7 in group stage, 9 in knockout stage

Most goals conceded in a season: 25
Young Africans SC  in 1998, 6 goals in preliminary rounds, 19 in group stage

Biggest win: 10 goals margin
Mamelodi Sundowns  - Cote d'Or FC  11-1 (27 September 2019, First round)
Difaâ El Jadidi  - Sport Bissau e Benfica  10-0 (10 February 2018 , First round)

Biggest aggregate win: 15 goals margin
Mamelodi Sundowns  - Cote d'Or FC  16-1 (5-0 away, 11-1 at home; 14 September, 27 September 2019, First round)

Most goals scored in a single match: 12
Mamelodi Sundowns  - Cote d'Or FC  11-1 (27 September 2019, First round)

Group stage records
Most group stage appearances: 19
Two teams hold the record.
Al-Ahly  (1999 to 2002, 2005 to 2008, 2010 to 2013, 2016 to 2021-22)
Espérance  (1999 to 2005, 2007, 2010 to 2014, 2017 to 2021-2022)

Most consecutive group stage appearances: 7
Espérance  (1999 to 2005)

Most times advanced past group stage: 16
Espérance 

Most time advanced past group stage as group winners: 15
Espérance 

Most consecutive advancements from group stage: 8
TP Mazembe  from 2009 to 2019–20 

Most times eliminated in group stage: 8
ASEC 

Most times qualified to group stage but failed to go past it: 2
Africa Sports 
Club Africain 
MC Alger 
Multiple teams (37) qualified only once to the group stage but failed to go past it.

Most group stage matches played: 114
Al-Ahly 

Most group stage matches won: 59
Espérance  in 112 matches

Most appearances without group stage qualification: 18
Stade Malien  (2020-21 season included)

Most teams from one nation/league: 18
 Nigeria Premier League; 12 teams qualified only once, eight teams managed to qualify to group stage

Fewest teams from one nation/league: 2
 Sudan Premier League; one team qualified 17 times, other qualified 15 times, both qualified to group stage (8 and 4 times respectively)

Teams that won all six group stage matches:
No teams did it in 24 editions, 56 groups played.

Undefeated through group stage:
10 teams went undefeated through the group stage. One team did it on five occasions, one team did it three times, three teams two times.
Espérance  in 2003 (4-2-0), 2011 (2-4-0), 2017 (3-3-0) and 2018-19 (4-2-0) and 2021-22 (4-2-0)
Étoile Sahel  in 2005 (2-4-0), 2017 (3-3-0) and 2018 (3-3-0)
Al-Ahly  in 2005 (4-2-0) and 2008 (3-3-0)
TP Mazembe  in 2018 (3-3-0) and 2019-20 (4-2-0)
Mamelodi Sundowns  in 2019-20 (4-2-0) and 2021-22 (5-1-0) 
Hearts of Oak in  2000 (4-2-0)
ASEC  in 2006 (3-3-0)
JS Kabylie  in 2010 (4-2-0)
Enyimba  in 2011 (4-2-0)
ES Sétif  in 2014 (2-4-0)
Wydad AC  in 2018 (3-3-0)

Winless in group stage:
24 teams went winless through the group stage. Four team did it twice.
Platinum  in 2018-19 (0-2-4) and 2019-20 (0-1-5)
Al-Merreikh  in 2009 (0-3-3) and in 2020-21 (0-2-4)
Zamalek  in 2012 (0-2-4) and in 2021-22 (0-4-2)
Orlando Pirates  in 1997 (0-1-5)
Young Africans SC  in 1998 (0-2-4)
Sable FC  in 2000 (0-1-5)
ASC Jeanne d'Arc  in 2000 (0-3-3)
CR Belouizdad  in 2001 (0-1-5)
Costa do Sol  in 2002 (0-0-6)
Ajax Cape Town  in 2005 (0-3-3)
Espérance  in 2005 (0-4-2)
Hearts of Oak  in 2006 (0-2-4)
Raja Casablanca  in 2011 (0-3-3)
MC El Eulma  in 2015 (0-1-5)
Coton Sport  in 2017 (0-0-6)
Ismaily  in 2018-19 (0-2-4)
1° do Agosto  in 2019-20 (0-4-2)
ZESCO United  in 2019-20 (0-3-3)
Petró Atlético  in 2019-20 (0-4-2)
USM Alger  in 2019-20 (0-3-3)
Petró Atlético  in 2020-21 (0-1-5)
Jwaneng Galaxy F.C.  in 2021-22 (0-1-5)
G.D. Sagrada Esperança  in 2021-22 (0-2-4)

Teams that lost each of 6 group stage matches:
Costa do Sol  in 2002
Coton Sport  in 2017

Fewest points and went past group stage:
7 points 
Wydad AC  in 2011 (1-4-1)

Most points and failed to go past group stage:
11 points 
Zanaco  in 2017 (3-2-1)

Most goals scored in group stage (single season): 15
Wydad AC  in 2022

Most goals scored in group stage (total): 143
Al-Ahly  in 102 matches

Most goals conceded in group stage (single season): 19
Young Africans SC  in 1998

Most goals conceded in group stage (total): 98
Al-Ahly  in 102 matches

Fewest goals scored in group stage (single season): 0
Hearts of Oak  in 2006, 0-7 goal difference

Fewest goals conceded in group stage (single season): 1
Espérance  in 1999
ASEC  in 2006
TP Mazembe  in 2015

Best goal differential in group stage (single season): +12
Espérance  in 1999, 13-1 goal difference

Worst goal difference in group stage (single season): -16
Costa do Sol  in 2002, 1-17 goal difference

Biggest win in a group stage match: 8 goals margin
TP Mazembe  - Club Africain  8-0 (2 February 2019)

Most goals scored in a group stage match: 
Dynamos  7-2 Saint-Louisienne

Players

Top goalscorers of more than one season

Top goalscorers

Hat-tricks

Since 2009

List of hat-tricks 

 4 Player scored 4 goals
 5 Player scored 5 goals

References

External links 
 https://web.archive.org/web/19980205024248/http://www.cafonline.com/

CAF Champions League records and statistics
African records